is the twelfth studio album by American singer Kim Carnes, released exclusively in Japan on March 21, 1991, via Zebrazone. Carnes co-produced the album with Joey Carbone.

Two years after the album was released, Carnes re-recorded the track "Gypsy Honeymoon" for her 1993 compilation album, Gypsy Honeymoon: The Best of Kim Carnes. Checkin' Out the Ghosts includes a re-recording of "Hangin' On by a Thread (A Sad Affair of the Heart)", which first appeared on Carnes' album Café Racers (1983). "Independent Girl" was released as the album's only single in 1991.

Track listing

Production 
 Joey Carbone – producer, arrangements 
 Kim Carnes – producer (1-6, 8, 9, 10), arrangements (1-6, 8, 9, 10)
 Fumihiro Ishikawa – executive producer 
 Leslie Ann Jones – recording, mixing 
 Bill Smith – recording, mixing 
 Mitch Zelezny – recording 
 Matt Hyde – mixing 
 Tom Biener – assistant engineer 
 Ray Blair – assistant engineer
 Scott Blockland – assistant engineer 
 Chris Fuhrman – assistant engineer 
 Mark Hagen – assistant engineer 
 Stephen Marcussen – mastering at Precision Mastering (Hollywood, California).
 Michelle Hart – production coordinator 
 Norman Moore – design 
 Henry Diltz – photography

Personnel 
 Kim Carnes – lead vocals, backing vocals (2, 3, 5, 6, 9)
 Steve Goldstein – keyboards (1-6, 10), synthesizers (8, 9)
 Collin Ellingson – programming (2), keyboard programming (3), guitar programming (3)
 Mike Tavera – keyboards (7), programming (7)
 Michael Thompson – guitars (1-6, 9, 10)
 Troy Dexter – guitars (7)
 Dennis Belfield – bass (1-6, 8, 9, 10)
 Carlos Vega – drums (1-6, 9, 10)
 Joey Carbone – tambourine (1-5), backing vocals (1, 10), keyboards (7)
 Roger Lebow – cello (4)
 Steve Madaio – trumpet (8)
 Dave Ellingson – backing vocals (1)
 Lynne Fiddmont-Linsey – backing vocals (1)
 Tampa Lann – backing vocals (1)
 Andrea Robinson – backing vocals (1)
 David Lasley – backing vocals (2, 9)
 Arnold McCuller – backing vocals (2, 9)
 Julie Waters – backing vocals (3, 6, 7)
 Maxine Waters – backing vocals (3, 6, 7)
 Joseph Williams – backing vocals (4, 6, 10)
 Donna Weiss – backing vocals (5)
 Crossroads Chamber Chorus – backing vocals (5)
 Carole Keiser – chorus director (5)
 Bill Champlin – backing vocals (6, 10)
 George Hawkins – backing vocals (6, 10)
 Myrna Matthews – backing vocals (7)

References

1991 albums
Kim Carnes albums
Teichiku Records albums